is a professional Japanese baseball player. He is a pitcher for the Orix Buffaloes of Nippon Professional Baseball (NPB).

References 

1997 births
Living people
Nippon Professional Baseball pitchers
Orix Buffaloes players
Baseball people from Hyōgo Prefecture